Éric Martin (born 29 August 1959) is a French former professional footballer who played as a midfielder. As of 2021, he is a scout for Ligue 2 club Nancy.

After football 
After retiring from football, Martin became a scout for Nancy. He also worked as a supervisor for Valenciennes.

Honours 
Nancy

 Division 2: 1989–90

References

External links 

 

1959 births
Living people
People from Verdun
French footballers
Association football midfielders
Association football scouts
INF Vichy players
AS Nancy Lorraine players
Paris Saint-Germain F.C. players
AS Nancy Lorraine non-playing staff
Ligue 1 players
French Division 3 (1971–1993) players
Ligue 2 players
Sportspeople from Meuse (department)
Footballers from Grand Est
France under-21 international footballers